Peter Galamboš (born 14 June 1989) is a Slovak professional ice hockey player who currently playing professionally in Slovakia for HK Dukla Michalovce of the Slovak Extraliga.

Career statistics

Regular season and playoffs

References

External links

 

Living people
Slovak ice hockey forwards
1989 births
MHC Martin players
HC Bílí Tygři Liberec players
HC Benátky nad Jizerou players
HC '05 Banská Bystrica players
Motor České Budějovice players
HC Košice players
HK Dukla Michalovce players
Sportspeople from Martin, Slovakia
Slovak expatriate ice hockey players in the Czech Republic